The Parliament of Cameroon is the legislature of Cameroon. A bicameral body, it consists of the Senate and the National Assembly. The parliament is composed of 187 members, 180 MPs and 100 senators.

References

Politics of Cameroon
Cameroon
Cameroon
Cameroon